Parly is a surname. Notable people with the surname include:

Florence Parly (born 1963), French politician
Ticho Parly (1928–1993), Danish opera singer

See also
Pardy